The Nirajul Mic is a left tributary of the river Niraj in Romania. It discharges into the Niraj in Miercurea Nirajului.

It should not be confused with the Nirajul Mic, having the same name, a headwater of the Niraj, which it joins in the village of Câmpu Cetății.

References

Rivers of Romania
Rivers of Mureș County